Go Toward the Light is a 1988 television film starring Linda Hamilton, Joshua Harris and Richard Thomas. The film first aired on CBS on November 1, 1988.

Plot
A young couple face the realities of life with their hemophiliac child who is diagnosed with AIDS from contaminated haemophilia blood products. The young couple (Linda Hamilton, Richard Thomas) try to prepare their young son (Joshua Harris) for his inevitable fate.

Cast
 Linda Hamilton  as Claire Madison
 Richard Thomas as Greg Madison
 Joshua Harris as Ben Madison
 Piper Laurie as Margo
 Ned Beatty as George
 Gary Bayer as Dr. Gladstone
 Rosemary Dunsmore as Sally
 Steven Eckholdt as Jeff
 Brian Bonsall as Zack Madison
 Mitchell Allen as Brian Madison
 Brian Lando as Keith
 Ryan McWhorter as Randy
 Jack Tate as Rick

External links
 

1988 television films
1988 films
1988 drama films
CBS network films
Films scored by James Newton Howard
HIV/AIDS in American films
Works about contaminated haemophilia blood products
HIV/AIDS in television
1980s English-language films